Sphecosoma melissa is a moth in the subfamily Arctiinae. It was described by William Schaus in 1896. It is found in the Brazilian states of Santa Catarina and São Paulo.

References

Moths described in 1896
Sphecosoma